The list of World War I flying aces born in Georgia is incomplete but contains one name:

 Alexander P. de Seversky, credited with six confirmed aerial victories while serving with the Imperial Russian Air Service.

References

Works cited
 

Georgia
People of World War I from Georgia (country)
World War I aces
World War I aces